The Alfred Kropp series is a trilogy of young adult fantasy novels written by American author Rick Yancey. The first book, The Extraordinary Adventures of Alfred Kropp, received a starred review from Publishers Weekly, was named a  Publishers Weekly Best Children's Book of the Year and was a finalist for the Carnegie Medal.  The second book, Alfred Kropp: The Seal of Solomon, received a positive review from Publishers Weekly and was released in May 2007.  The third book, Alfred Kropp: The Thirteenth Skull, was already written and on the store shelves for sale, but was announced by Yancey in Publishers Weekly in April 2006

Books
 The Extraordinary Adventures of Alfred Kropp (2005)
 Alfred Kropp: The Seal of Solomon (2007)
 Alfred Kropp: The Thirteenth Skull (2008)

References

Book series introduced in 2005
American young adult novels
Young adult novel series
Fantasy novel series